The Roman Catholic Diocese of Lucena is a diocese of the Roman Catholic Church in the Philippines with the seat in Lucena City.  The Roman Rite Latin Church diocese was erected in 1950 from the Archdiocese of Lipa to become a suffragan diocese of the Archdiocese.  In 1977, the Diocese of Boac, which covers the parishes in the island-province of Marinduque, was created and separated from Lucena.  In 1984, the Diocese of Lucena was further divided with the creation of the Diocese of Gumaca, which covers the municipalities of Quezon province east of Gumaca, Quezon.

Ordinaries

Schools
Casa del Niño Jesus de Pagbilao

See also

Catholic Church in the Philippines

References

External links 

  Sanctuary in Agdangan, Quezon

Lucena
Lucena
Lucena
Lucena
1950 establishments in the Philippines
Lucena, Philippines
Religion in Quezon